Heath Ledger: His Beautiful Life and Mysterious Death is the first book-length biography of Australian actor Heath Ledger since his death on 22 January 2008, written by British journalist John McShane. It was published on 7 April 2008 by John Blake, in London, and on 15 June 2008, in the United States.

Notes

References
McShane John.  Heath Ledger: His Beautiful Life and Mysterious Death.  London: John Blake, 2008.   (10).   (13). (Excerpt listed below.)

Australian biographies
Books about actors
Heath Ledger